Laurell Kaye Hamilton (born February 19, 1963) is an American fantasy and romance writer.  She is best known as the author of two series of stories.

Her New York Times-bestselling Anita Blake: Vampire Hunter series centers on Anita Blake, a professional zombie raiser, vampire executioner and supernatural consultant for the police, which includes novels, short story collections, and comic books. Six million copies of Anita Blake novels are in print. Her Merry Gentry series centers on Meredith Gentry, Princess of the Unseelie court of Faerie, a private detective facing repeated assassination attempts. Both of these fantasy series follow their protagonists as they gain in power and deal with the dangers of worlds in which creatures of legend live.

Several media outlets, including USA Today, Entertainment Weekly, and Time have identified her works as significant contributions to the development of the urban-fantasy genre.

Personal life 
Laurell Kaye Hamilton was born Laurell Kaye Klein in Heber Springs, Arkansas but grew up in Sims, Indiana with her grandmother Laura Gentry. Her education includes degrees in English and biology from Marion College (now  called Indiana Wesleyan University), a private Evangelical Christian liberal arts college in Marion, Indiana that is affiliated with the Wesleyan Church denomination.  She met Gary Hamilton, whom she married, there.  They have one daughter together, Trinity.

Hamilton is involved with a number of animal charities, particularly supporting dog rescue efforts and wolf preservation.

Hamilton currently lives in St. Louis County, Missouri, with her daughter Trinity, and husband Jonathon Green whom she married in 2001.

Works
Laurell K. Hamilton is the author of two major book series, spin-off comic books, various anthologies, and other stand-alone titles:
 Anita Blake: Vampire Hunter is an animator and necromancer who raises the dead for a living. She is also a vampire executioner and in later books a U.S. Marshal. Blake lives in a fictional St. Louis where vampires and were-animals exist and recently gained some rights as citizens. As of November 2013, Hamilton has published 22 novels and 5 novellas in the Anita Blake series. As of 2009 more than 6 million copies of Anita Blake novels have been printed and several have become New York Times bestsellers.
 Anita Blake comics are the comic-book renditions of the Anita Blake series. As of May 2012, the comic-book series has included her first three books, Guilty Pleasures, Laughing Corpse and Circus of the Damned. There was also a special prologue comic issued named, "The First Death".
 Merry Gentry is a Princess of Faerie and a private investigator. She is constantly dodging assassination attempts while juggling life in the "real world" where everyone knows faeries exist. As of 2014, there have been a total of nine novels in the Merry Gentry series.

Reception
Entertainment Weekly and USA Today have identified Hamilton as having a significant impact on urban fantasy. In 2008, Time declared that the popularity of the genre "owes everything to Laurell K. Hamilton". Authors Courtney Allison Moulton and Kelly Gay have noted Hamilton as an inspiration.

Anita Blake
Reader reaction to the series's shift in tone from crime noir thriller to focus more predominantly on the sexual themes in the series has been mixed, starting with Narcissus in Chains when the main character of Anita Blake becomes infected with the ardeur. The ardeur is a supernatural power inadvertently given to Anita by her vampire Master Jean-Claude that gives her massive amounts of power but also demands that she have sexual intercourse with several different people through the course of a day, sometimes in large groups. Reception to these dynamics and to the usage of sexual abuse in later books has been mixed, with some reviewers commenting that the character of Anita spent too much time "obsessing about whether or not she’s a slut" while others remarked that the erotic themes enhanced the series. In response to these comments, Hamilton issued a blog entitled "Dear Negative Reader" where she addressed a growing number of readers on the Internet that were expressing disappointment in the series's changes. In the blog Hamilton told the readers that "life is too short to read books you don’t like" and that if they found that the current subject matter pushed "you past that comfortable envelope of the mundane" then "stop reading" and speculated that some of the readers were either "closet readers" or comment based on others' opinions. The blog entry was negatively received by some readers.

Critical reviewers have also commented on the amount of sex in later books, as in a 2006 review in The Boston Globe of Micah. The review was largely negative, stating "we were not impressed. Hamilton no doubt appeals to romance and erotica lovers, but it does not take long for the clichés and the constant droning about sex to become tiresome." Other reviewers for The Kansas City Star and Publishers Weekly also commented on the rise in sexual themes in the series. The reviewer for the Kansas City Star stated that "After 13 erotically charged books, boredom has reared its ugly head for the 14th novel in Laurell K. Hamilton's Anita Blake series, as eroticism becomes mere description..." and Publishers Weekly commented that Blood Noir had a "growing air of ennui, which longtime readers can't help sharing as sex increasingly takes the place of plot and character development".

In contrast, a Denver Post review of Danse Macabre took a more positive view of the eroticism in Hamilton's work.  Although it noted that "[t]hose looking for mystery and mayhem on this Anita adventure are out of luck" it also stated that "the main attraction of the Anita Blake novels in the past five years has been their erotic novelty", and "[f]ew, if any, mainstream novels delve so deeply into pure, unadulterated erotica".

Bibliography

Anita Blake: Vampire Hunter
 Guilty Pleasures (1993) 
 The Laughing Corpse (1994) 
 Circus of the Damned (1995) 
 The Lunatic Cafe (1996) 
 Bloody Bones (1996) 
 The Killing Dance (1997) 
 Burnt Offerings (1998) 
 Blue Moon (1998) 
 Obsidian Butterfly (2000) 
 Narcissus in Chains (2001) 
 Cerulean Sins (2003) 
 Incubus Dreams (2004) 
 Micah (2006) 
 Danse Macabre (2006) 
 The Harlequin (2007) 
 Blood Noir (2008) 
 Skin Trade (2009) 
 Flirt (2010) 
 Bullet (2010) 
 Hit List (2011) 
 Kiss the Dead (2012) 
 Affliction (2013) 
 Jason (2014) 
 Dead Ice (2015) 
 Crimson Death (2016) 
 Serpentine (August 7, 2018) 
 Sucker Punch (August 4, 2020) 
 Rafael (February 9, 2021)

Anita Blake novellas and short stories
 Those Who Seek Forgiveness (2006)
 published as part of Strange Candy, number 00.5
 The Girl Who Was Infatuated with Death (2006)
 published as part of Strange Candy, number 08.5
 Beauty (2012) 
 novella, number 20.5
 Dancing (2013) 
 novella, number 21.5
 Shutdown
 short story; unofficially and temporarily released October 2013
 not yet formally published, book number 21.75
 Wounded (December 2016)
 novella, number 24.5
 "Sweet Seduction"
 short story/novelette; collected in Noir Fatale, May 2019
 Zombie Dearest (2020)
 novella, number 26.5
 short story/novelette; collected in "Fantastic Hope", April 2020

Marvel Comics series
(in Anita's chronological order)
 Laurell K. Hamilton's Anita Blake, Vampire Hunter: The First Death 1–2 (7 & 12/2007)
 Guilty Pleasures Handbook (2007)
 Anita Blake Vampire Hunter: Guilty Pleasures 1–12 (12/2006 – 8/2008)
 Anita Blake: The Laughing Corpse – Animator 1–5 (10/2008 – 2/2009)
 Anita Blake: The Laughing Corpse – Necromancer 1–5 (4/2009 – 9/2009)
 Anita Blake: The Laughing Corpse – Executioner 1–5 (9/2009 – 3/2010)
 Anita Blake: Circus of The Damned – The Charmer 1–5 (5/2010 – 10/2010)
 Anita Blake: Circus of The Damned – The Ingenue 1–5 (1/2011–ongoing)
 Anita Blake: Circus of the Damned – The Scoundrel 1–5 (Ongoing)

Science Fiction Book Club Omnibus Editions
 Club Vampyre
 Guilty Pleasures
 The Laughing Corpse
 Circus of the Damned
 Midnight Cafe
The Lunatic Cafe
 Bloody Bones
The Killing Dance
 Black Moon Inn
Burnt Offerings
 Blue Moon
 Nightshade Tavern
 Obsidian Butterfly
 Narcissus in Chains
 Out of This World
 first 100 pages of Narcissus in Chains

Merry Gentry series
 A Kiss of Shadows (2000) 
 A Caress of Twilight (2002) 
 Seduced by Moonlight (2004) 
 A Stroke of Midnight (2005) 
 Mistral's Kiss (2006) 
 A Lick of Frost (2007) 
 Swallowing Darkness (2008) 
 Divine Misdemeanors (2009) 
 A Shiver of Light (2014)

Others
 Nightseer (1992)
 Nightshade (1992)
 Star Trek: The Next Generation authorized novel #24)
 Death of a Darklord (1995)
 TSR's Ravenloft series
 Superheroes (anthology, 1995)
 A Clean Sweep
 Cravings, (anthology, 2004)
 Blood upon my lips
 Bite (anthology, 2004)
 The Girl Infatuated with Death
 Strange Candy, (2006)
 14 published and unpublished short stories
 Never After (anthology, 2009)
 Can He Bake a Cherry Pie
 Ardeur: 14 Writers on the Anita Blake, Vampire Hunter Series (2010)
 Dead Ice (2016)
 Extra chapter in paperback edition
 Wounded

Critical studies, reviews and biography

References

Sources
Literature

 

Interviews
 Riverfront Times (Nov 2008)
 Locus Online Interview (Sept 2000)
 Interview at SFFWorld.com(Nov 2000)
 The SF Site: A Conversation with Laurell K. Hamilton (Sept 2004)
 Interview with Bankrate.com (Nov 2004)
 Interview on Flames Rising (June 2006)
 Interview on wotmania.com (June 2006)
 The WD Interview: Laurell K. Hamilton (March 2008)
  (June 2014)

External links 

 
 
 

1963 births
20th-century American novelists
21st-century American novelists
20th-century American women writers
21st-century American women writers
American erotica writers
American fantasy writers
American horror writers
American women novelists
BDSM writers
Erotic horror writers
Indiana Wesleyan University alumni
Living people
People from Heber Springs, Arkansas
People from St. Louis County, Missouri
Urban fantasy writers
Writers from Arkansas
Novelists from Indiana
Novelists from Missouri
Women science fiction and fantasy writers
Women horror writers
Women erotica writers
Dark fantasy writers